Pythagorean tuning is a system of musical tuning in which the frequency ratios of all intervals are based on the ratio 3:2. This ratio, also known as the "pure" perfect fifth, is chosen because it is one of the most consonant and easiest to tune by ear and because of importance attributed to the integer 3. As Novalis put it, "The musical proportions seem to me to be particularly correct natural proportions." Alternatively, it can be described as the tuning of the syntonic temperament in which the generator is the ratio 3:2 (i.e., the untempered perfect fifth), which is ≈702 cents wide.

The system dates to Ancient Mesopotamia; see . The system is named, and has been widely misattributed, to Ancient Greeks, notably Pythagoras (sixth century BC) by modern authors of music theory, while Ptolemy, and later Boethius, ascribed the division of the tetrachord by only two intervals, called "semitonium", "tonus", "tonus" in Latin (256:243 × 9:8 × 9:8), to Eratosthenes. The so-called "Pythagorean tuning" was used by musicians up to the beginning of the 16th century. "The Pythagorean system would appear to be ideal because of the purity of the fifths, but some consider other intervals, particularly the major third, to be so badly out of tune that major chords [may be considered] a dissonance."

The Pythagorean scale is any scale which can be constructed from only pure perfect fifths (3:2) and octaves (2:1). In Greek music it was used to tune tetrachords, which were composed into scales spanning an octave. A distinction can be made between extended Pythagorean tuning and a 12-tone Pythagorean temperament. Extended Pythagorean tuning corresponds 1-on-1 with western music notation and there is no limit to the number of fifths. In 12-tone Pythagorean temperament however one is limited by 12-tones per octave and one cannot play most music according to the Pythagorean system corresponding to the enharmonic notation, instead one finds that for instance the diminished sixth becomes a "wolf fifth".

Method

12-tone Pythagorean temperament is based on a stack of intervals called perfect fifths, each tuned in the ratio 3:2, the next simplest ratio after 2:1. Starting from D for example (D-based tuning), six other notes are produced by moving six times a ratio 3:2 up, and the remaining ones by moving the same ratio down:

E♭–B♭–F–C–G–D–A–E–B–F♯–C♯–G♯

This succession of eleven 3:2 intervals spans across a wide range of frequency (on a piano keyboard, it encompasses 77 keys). Since notes differing in frequency by a factor of 2 are perceived as similar and given the same name (octave equivalence), it is customary to divide or multiply the frequencies of some of these notes by 2 or by a power of 2. The purpose of this adjustment is to move the 12 notes within a smaller range of frequency, namely within the interval between the base note D and the D above it (a note with twice its frequency). This interval is typically called the basic octave (on a piano keyboard, an octave has only 12 keys). This dates to antiquity: in Ancient Mesopotamia, rather than stacking fifths, tuning was based on alternating ascending fifths and descending fourths (equal to an ascending fifth followed by a descending octave), resulting in the notes of a pentatonic or heptatonic scale falling within an octave.

For instance, the A is tuned such that its frequency equals 3/2 times the frequency of D—if D is tuned to a frequency of 288 Hz, then A is tuned to 432 Hz. Similarly, the E above A is tuned such that its frequency equals 3/2 times the frequency of A, or 9/4 times the frequency of D—with A at 432 Hz, this puts E at 648 Hz. Since this E is outside the above-mentioned basic octave (i.e. its frequency is more than twice the frequency of the base note D), it is usual to halve its frequency to move it within the basic octave. Therefore, E is tuned to 324 Hz, a 9/8 (= one epogdoon) above D. The B at 3/2 above that E is tuned to the ratio 27:16 and so on. Starting from the same point working the other way, G is tuned as 3/2 below D, which means that it is assigned a frequency equal to 2/3 times the frequency of D—with D at 288 Hz, this puts G at 192 Hz. This frequency is then doubled (to 384 Hz) to bring it into the basic octave.

When extending this tuning however, a problem arises: no stack of 3:2 intervals (perfect fifths) will fit exactly into any stack of 2:1 intervals (octaves). For instance a stack such as this, obtained by adding one more note to the stack shown above

A♭–E♭–B♭–F–C–G–D–A–E–B–F♯–C♯–G♯

will be similar but not identical in size to a stack of 7 octaves. More exactly, it will be about a quarter of a semitone larger, called the Pythagorean comma. Thus, A and G, when brought into the basic octave, will not coincide as expected. The table below illustrates this, showing for each note in the basic octave the conventional name of the interval from D (the base note), the formula to compute its frequency ratio, its size in cents, and the difference in cents (labeled 12-TET-dif in the table) between its size and the size of the corresponding one in the equally tempered scale.

{| class="wikitable" style="text-align: center"
! class="unsortable"|Note
! class="unsortable"|Interval from D
! class="unsortable"|Formula
!=
! class="unsortable"|=
! class="unsortable"|Frequencyratio
! Size(cents)
! 12-TET-dif(cents)
|-
| A
| diminished fifth
| 
|
| 
|
|style="text-align: right"|   588.27
|style="text-align: right"|   −11.73
|-
| E
| minor second
| 
|
| 
|
|style="text-align: right"|  90.22
|style="text-align: right"| −9.78
|-
| B
| minor sixth
| 
|
| 
|
|style="text-align: right"| 792.18
|style="text-align: right"| −7.82
|-
| F
| minor third
| 
|
| 
|
|style="text-align: right"| 294.13
|style="text-align: right"| −5.87
|-
| C
| minor seventh
| 
|
| 
|
|style="text-align: right"|  996.09
|style="text-align: right"| −3.91
|-
| G
| perfect fourth
| 
|
| 
|
|style="text-align: right"| 498.04
|style="text-align: right"| −1.96
|-
| D
| unison
| 
|
| 
|
|style="text-align: right"| 0.00
|style="text-align: right"| 0.00
|-
| A
| perfect fifth
| 
|
| 
|
|style="text-align: right"| 701.96
|style="text-align: right"| 1.96
|-
| E
| major second
| 
|
| 
|
|style="text-align: right"|   203.91
|style="text-align: right"| 3.91
|-
| B
| major sixth
| 
|
| 
|
|style="text-align: right"|  905.87
|style="text-align: right"| 5.87
|-
| F
| major third
| 
|
| 
|
|style="text-align: right"|   407.82
|style="text-align: right"| 7.82
|-
| C
| major seventh
| 
|
| 
|
|style="text-align: right"|  1109.78
|style="text-align: right"| 9.78
|-
| G
| augmented fourth
| 
|
| 
|
|style="text-align: right"|   611.73
|style="text-align: right"| 11.73
|}

In the formulas, the ratios 3:2 or 2:3 represent an ascending or descending perfect fifth (i.e. an increase or decrease in frequency by a perfect fifth, while 2:1 or 1:2 represent a rising or lowering octave). The formulas can also be expressed in terms of powers of the third and the second harmonics.

The major scale based on C, obtained from this tuning is:

{| class="wikitable" style="text-align:center"
!Note
!colspan="2" | C
!colspan="2" | D
!colspan="2" | E
!colspan="2" | F
!colspan="2" | G
!colspan="2" | A
!colspan="2" | B
!colspan="2" | C
|-
!Ratio
|colspan="2" |
|colspan="2" |
|colspan="2" |
|colspan="2" |
|colspan="2" |
|colspan="2" |
|colspan="2" |
|colspan="2" |
|-
!Step
|colspan="1" | —
|colspan="2" |
|colspan="2" |
|colspan="2" |
|colspan="2" |
|colspan="2" |
|colspan="2" |
|colspan="2" |
|colspan="1" | —
|}

In equal temperament, pairs of enharmonic notes such as A and G are thought of as being exactly the same note—however, as the above table indicates, in Pythagorean tuning they have different ratios with respect to D, which means they are at a different frequency. This discrepancy, of about 23.46 cents, or nearly one quarter of a semitone, is known as a Pythagorean comma.

To get around this problem, Pythagorean tuning constructs only twelve notes as above, with eleven fifths between them. For example, one may use only the 12 notes from E to G. This, as shown above, implies that only eleven just fifths are used to build the entire chromatic scale. The remaining interval (the diminished sixth from G to E) is left badly out-of-tune, meaning that any music which combines those two notes is unplayable in this tuning. A very out-of-tune interval such as this one is known as a wolf interval. In the case of Pythagorean tuning, all the fifths are 701.96 cents wide, in the exact ratio 3:2, except the wolf fifth, which is only 678.49 cents wide, nearly a quarter of a semitone flatter.

If the notes G and E need to be sounded together, the position of the wolf fifth can be changed. For example, a C-based Pythagorean tuning would produce a stack of fifths running from D to F, making F-D the wolf interval. However, there will always be one wolf fifth in Pythagorean tuning, making it impossible to play in all keys in tune.

Size of intervals 
The table above shows only intervals from D. However, intervals can be formed by starting from each of the above listed 12 notes. Thus, twelve intervals can be defined for each interval type (twelve  unisons, twelve semitones, twelve intervals composed of 2 semitones, twelve intervals composed of 3 semitones, etc.).

As explained above, one of the twelve fifths (the wolf fifth) has a different size with respect to the other eleven. For a similar reason, each of the other interval types, except for the unisons and the octaves, has two different sizes in Pythagorean tuning. This is the price paid for seeking just intonation. The tables on the right and below show their frequency ratios and their approximate sizes in cents. Interval names are given in their standard shortened form. For instance, the size of the interval from D to A, which is a perfect fifth (P5), can be found in the seventh column of the row labeled D. Strictly just (or pure) intervals are shown in bold font. Wolf intervals are highlighted in red.

The reason why the interval sizes vary throughout the scale is that the pitches forming the scale are unevenly spaced. Namely, the frequencies defined by construction for the twelve notes determine two different semitones (i.e. intervals between adjacent notes):

 The minor second (m2), also called diatonic semitone, with size   (e.g. between D and E)
 The augmented unison (A1), also called chromatic semitone, with size   (e.g. between E and E)

Conversely, in an equally tempered chromatic scale, by definition the twelve pitches are equally spaced, all semitones having a size of exactly

As a consequence all intervals of any given type have the same size (e.g., all major thirds have the same size, all fifths have the same size, etc.). The price paid, in this case, is that none of them is justly tuned and perfectly consonant, except, of course, for the unison and the octave.

By definition, in Pythagorean tuning 11 perfect fifths (P5 in the table) have a size of approximately 701.955 cents (700+ε cents, where ε ≈ 1.955 cents). Since the average size of the 12 fifths must equal exactly 700 cents (as in equal temperament), the other one must have a size of 700−11ε cents, which is about 678.495 cents (the wolf fifth). Notice that, as shown in the table, the latter interval, although enharmonically equivalent to a fifth, is more properly called a diminished sixth (d6). Similarly,
 9 minor thirds (m3) are ≈ 294.135 cents (300−3ε), 3 augmented seconds (A2) are ≈ 317.595 cents (300+9ε), and their average is 300 cents;
 8 major thirds (M3) are ≈ 407.820 cents (400+4ε), 4 diminished fourths (d4) are ≈ 384.360 cents (400−8ε), and their average is 400 cents;
 7 diatonic semitones (m2) are ≈ 90.225 cents (100−5ε), 5 chromatic semitones (A1) are ≈ 113.685 cents (100+7ε), and their average is 100 cents.

In short, similar differences in width are observed for all interval types, except for unisons and octaves, and they are all multiples of ε, the difference between the Pythagorean fifth and the average fifth.

Notice that, as an obvious consequence, each augmented or diminished interval is exactly 12ε (≈ 23.460) cents narrower or wider than its enharmonic equivalent. For instance, the d6 (or wolf fifth) is 12ε cents narrower than each P5, and each A2 is 12ε cents wider than each m3. This interval of size 12ε is known as a Pythagorean comma, exactly equal to the opposite of a diminished second (≈ −23.460 cents). This implies that ε can be also defined as one twelfth of a Pythagorean comma.

Pythagorean intervals 

Four of the above-mentioned intervals take a specific name in Pythagorean tuning. In the following table, these specific names are provided, together with alternative names used generically for some other intervals. Notice that the Pythagorean comma does not coincide with the diminished second, as its size (524288:531441) is the reciprocal of the Pythagorean diminished second (531441:524288). Also ditone and semiditone are specific for Pythagorean tuning, while tone and tritone are used generically for all tuning systems. Despite its name, a semiditone (3 semitones, or about 300 cents) can hardly be viewed as half of a ditone (4 semitones, or about 400 cents). All the intervals with prefix sesqui- are justly tuned, and their frequency ratio, shown in the table, is a superparticular number (or epimoric ratio). The same is true for the octave.

{| class="wikitable"
! rowspan="3"| Number ofsemitones!! colspan="4"|Generic names !! colspan="3"|Specific names
|-
! colspan="2"| Quality and number !! colspan="2" rowspan="2"|Other naming conventions !! rowspan="2"|Pythagorean tuning  (pitch ratio names)!! rowspan="2"|5-limit tuning !! rowspan="2"|1/4-commameantone
|-
! Full !! Short
|-
| 0 || || || colspan="2"| comma || Pythagorean comma (524288:531441) || rowspan="2"| ||rowspan="2"| diesis (128:125)
|-
| 0 || diminished second || d2 || colspan="2"| || (531441:524288)
|-
| 1 || minor second || m2  || rowspan="2"| semitone,half tone,half step || diatonic semitone,minor semitone || limma (λείμμα) (256:243) || ||
|-
| 1 || augmented unison || A1 || chromatic semitone,major semitone || apotome (αποτομή) (2187:2048) || ||
|-
| 2 || major second || M2 
| colspan="2" | tone, whole tone, whole step
| colspan="2" style="text-align: center" | epogdoön (επόγδοον), sesquioctavum (9:8) ||
|-
| 3 || minor third || m3 || colspan="2"| || semiditone (32:27) || sesquiquintum (6:5) ||
|-
| 4 || major third || M3 || colspan="2"| || ditone (δίτονον) (81:64) || colspan="2" style="text-align: center"| sesquiquartum (5:4)
|-
| 5 || perfect fourth || P4 || colspan="2" | diatessaron (διατεσσάρων)
| colspan="2" style="text-align: center" | epitrite (επίτριτος), sesquitertium (4:3) ||
|-
| 6 || diminished fifth || d5 
| colspan="2" rowspan="2"|   
||   || ||
|-
| 6 || augmented fourth|| A4 
|| tritone (τρίτονον) (729:512) || ||
|-
| 7 || perfect fifth|| P5 
| colspan="2" |  diapente (διαπέντε)
| colspan="2" style="text-align: center" | hemiolion (ημιόλιον), sesquialterum (3:2) ||
|-
| 12 || (perfect) octave || P8 
| colspan="2" | diapason (διαπασών)   
| colspan="3" style="text-align: center" | duplex (2:1)
|}

History and usage
The system dates to Ancient Mesopotamia, and consisted of alternating ascending fifths and descending fourths; see . Within Ancient Greek music, the system had been mainly attributed to Pythagoras (who lived around 500 BCE) by modern authors of music theory; Ancient Greeks borrowed much of their music theory from Mesopotamia, including the diatonic scale, Pythagorean tuning, and modes. The Chinese Shí-èr-lǜ scale uses the same intervals as the Pythagorean scale and was invented between 600 BCE - 240 CE.

Because of the wolf interval when using a 12-tone Pythagorean temperament, this tuning is rarely used today, although it is thought to have been widespread. In music which does not change key very often, or which is not very harmonically adventurous, the wolf interval is unlikely to be a problem, as not all the possible fifths will be heard in such pieces. In extended Pythagorean tuning there is no wolf interval, all perfect fifths are exactly 3:2.

Because most fifths in 12-tone Pythagorean temperament are in the simple ratio of 3:2, they sound very "smooth" and consonant. The thirds, by contrast, most of which are in the relatively complex ratios of 81:64 (for major thirds) and 32:27 (for minor thirds), sound less smooth depending on the instrument.

From about 1510 onward, as thirds came to be treated as consonances, meantone temperament, and particularly quarter-comma meantone, which tunes thirds to the relatively simple ratio of 5:4, became the most popular system for tuning keyboards. At the same time, syntonic-diatonic just intonation was posited first by Ramos and then by Zarlino as the normal tuning for singers.

However, meantone presented its own harmonic challenges. Its wolf intervals proved to be even worse than those of the Pythagorean tuning (so much so that it often required 19 keys to the octave as opposed to the 12 in Pythagorean tuning). As a consequence, meantone was not suitable for all music. From around the 18th century, as the desire grew for instruments to change key, and therefore to avoid a wolf interval, this led to the widespread use of well temperaments and eventually equal temperament.

Pythagorean temperament can still be heard in some parts of modern classical music from singers and from instruments with no fixed tuning such as the violin family. Where a performer has an unaccompanied passage based on scales, they will tend towards using Pythagorean intonation as that will make the scale sound best in tune, then reverting to other temperaments for other passages (just intonation for chordal or arpeggiated figures, and equal temperament when accompanied with piano or orchestra).  This can be seen in the first bar of Bach's Sonata no.1 for unaccompanied violin, where the b-flat in the opening chord is played naturally in just intonation and sounds flatter than the subsequent b-flat which appears in a descending scale and is naturally Pythagorean. Such changes are never explicitly notated and are scarcely noticeable to the audience, just sounding 'in tune'.

Discography
Bragod is a duo giving historically informed performances of mediaeval Welsh music using the crwth and six-stringed lyre using Pythagorean tuning
Gothic Voices – Music for the Lion-Hearted King (Hyperion, CDA66336, 1989), directed by Christopher Page (Leech-Wilkinson)
Lou Harrison performed by John Schneider and the Cal Arts Percussion Ensemble conducted by John Bergamo - Guitar & Percussion (Etceter Records, KTC1071, 1990): Suite No. 1 for guitar and percussion and Plaint & Variations on "Song of Palestine"

See also

 53 equal temperament, a near-Pythagorean tuning
 Enharmonic scale
 List of meantone intervals
 List of musical intervals
 List of pitch intervals
 Regular temperament
 Shí-èr-lǜ
 Musical temperament
 Timaeus (dialogue), in which Plato discusses Pythagorean tuning
 Whole-tone scale

References

Citations

Sources
 
Daniel Leech-Wilkinson (1997), "The good, the bad and the boring", Companion to Medieval & Renaissance Music. Oxford University Press. .

External links
"A Pythagorean tuning of the diatonic scale", with audio samples.
"Pythagorean Tuning and Medieval Polyphony", by Margo Schulter.
Creating a Pythagorean Tuning in a Spreadsheet, video with audio samples.

Greek music

Pythagorean philosophy